The 2010 Women's Junior World Handball Championship (17th tournament) took place in South Korea from July 17 to July 31.

Preliminary round

Group A

Group B

Group C

Group D

Main round

Group I

Group II

President's Cup

21st–24th

23rd/24th

21st/22nd

17th–20th

19th/20th

17th/18th

13th–16th

15th/16th

13th/14th

Placement matches

11th/12th

9th/10th

7th/8th

5th/6th

Final round

Semifinals

Bronze medal match

Gold medal match

Ranking and statistics

Final ranking

All Star Team
Goalkeeper: 
Left wing: 
Left back: 
Pivot: 
Centre back: 
Right back: 
Right wing: 
Chosen by team officials and IHF experts: IHF.info

Other awards
Most Valuable Player: 
Top Goalscorer: 75 goals

Top goalkeepers

Source: ihf.info

Top goalscorers

Source: ihf.info

References
Tournament Summary

External links
XVII Women's Junior World Championship at IHF.info

International handball competitions hosted by South Korea
Women's Junior World Handball Championship, 2010
2010
Women's handball in South Korea
Junior World Handball Championship
July 2010 sports events in South Korea